Zvanivka is a village (selo) in eastern Ukraine, located in Bakhmut Raion, Donetsk Oblast. Zvanivka hosts the administration of the Zvanivka rural hromada, one of the Hromadas of Ukraine.

Climate 
Zvanivka has a cold and temperate climate, and receives significant rainfall.

Archeology 
In 1969, an ancient settlement from the Mousterian culture from the Paleolithic Age was discovered at the site of Zvanivka.

History 
In 1859, Zvanivka was noted as being a manor village with a population of 136 people and an Orthodox church.

Soviet era 
As a result of the Holodomor, 108 residents of Zvanivka died.

In 1951, Boykos were resettled in Zvanivka - these were formerly residents of the villages of Liskowate and Moczary, the territories of which were transferred to Poland as part of the 1951 Polish-Soviet territorial exchange.

21st century 
During Russia's full-scale invasion of Ukraine in 2022-2023, Zvanivka came under Russian shelling.

Demographics 

A significant amount of the population is families of displaced Lemkos and Boykos.

Religion 
A monastery of the Order of Saint Basil the Great of the Ukrainian Greek Catholic Church operates in the village. The monastery was founded on July 27, 1998.

In 2018 and 2019, Zvanivka hosted a regional festival of nativity scenes and Christmas carols.

References 

Boykos
Villages in Bakhmut Raion
Commons category link is on Wikidata